James Ranelagh Ponsonby Parsons (ca. 1839 – 9 August 1905) was a South Australian educator.

Parsons was born in Ireland, the son of Henry Parsons of Trim, County Meath.  In 1848 he accompanied his parents to Tasmania, where he spent his early years. In 1875, he moved to South Australia, where he held positions on the teaching staffs of Moonta school, and in Adelaide, St Peter's College, Mr. J. L. Young's Adelaide Educational Institution (in Parkside), principal of Adelaide High School, in 1880 and from 1882, Frederick Caterer's Glenelg Grammar School, (in Glenelg). He then founded the Collegiate School in Broadstairs Street, Glenelg.

He was an active churchman and for many years a lay reader, conducting services at St. Jude's, Brighton when it was without a permanent minister. His brother, Samuel Parsons, was incumbent of All Saints' and Canon of St David's, Hobart. 

Parsons married Sarah Cole Parsons (died 1 October 1913). Their eldest daughter, Emmeline Rutherford Parsons was married in 1895. Another daughter, Rachel Cole Ponsonby Parsons, died in 1939.

Parsons died at the age of 66 years at his residence in Glenelg, after a long illness, leaving a widow and a grown-up family.

References

People educated at Adelaide Educational Institution
Australian educators
Australian educational theorists
1905 deaths
Year of birth uncertain
Anglican lay readers
Australian Anglicans